Cindy Castellano is a retired American para-alpine skier. She won two gold medals in alpine skiing at the 1980 Winter Paralympics held in Geilo, Norway. She won the gold medal in the women's giant slalom 3A and women's slalom 3A events.

Her medals are on display at the United States Olympic & Paralympic Museum.

See also 
 List of Paralympic medalists in alpine skiing

References

External links 
 

Living people
Year of birth missing (living people)
Place of birth missing (living people)
American female alpine skiers
Paralympic alpine skiers of the United States
Alpine skiers at the 1980 Winter Paralympics
Medalists at the 1980 Winter Paralympics
Paralympic gold medalists for the United States